Wo Sang Wai, sometimes transliterated as Wo Shang Wai,  is a village in the San Tin area of Yuen Long District, Hong Kong.

Further reading

External links
 Delineation of area of existing village Wo Sang Wai (San Tin) for election of resident representative (2019 to 2022)

Villages in Yuen Long District, Hong Kong
San Tin